K. Renee Horton is an American physicist and Space Launch Systems Quality Engineer at NASA. She was the first black person to receive a PhD in material science and engineering with a concentration in physics at the University of Alabama. She is an advocate for black women in STEM fields and for disability rights.

Early life 
K. Renee Horton grew up in Baton Rouge, Louisiana. As a child, she hoped to become an astronaut, but due to a hearing impairment was not able to pursue it as a career. From this inspiration, she decided to pursue science. She graduated from high school at 16. She did not discover her hearing loss until she was 18, when she attempted to enroll in the Air Force ROTC program but was unable to.

Education 
She attended Louisiana State University for her undergraduate education, and received a bachelor's degree in electrical engineering in 2002. She then attended the University of Alabama and received a PhD in material science and engineering with a concentration in physics in 2011. Horton was the first Black person to receive a degree in this discipline from the University of Alabama. Her thesis was titled "Microhardness, strength and strain field characterization of self-reacting friction stir and plug welds of dissimilar aluminum alloys," and her doctoral advisor was Mark Barkey. While at University of Alabama, she was a member of the Delta Sigma Theta sorority. She began working at NASA as a student, from 2009–2011. As a student, Horton also worked at the Center for Materials for Information Technology at the University of Alabama, where as part of her work she led an outreach program for children in Tuscaloosa, Alabama.

Career 
Horton is a NASA Space Launch System (SLS) Quality Engineer at Michoud Assembly Facility (MAF) in New Orleans, Louisiana, where she began working in 2012. There, she works on the rocket that will send Artemis astronauts and cargo to the Moon. As of 2022, she was also an airworthiness deputy for the Electrified Powertrain Flight Demonstrator Project at NASA.

In 2016, Horton was elected president of the National Society of Black Physicists (NSBP). Upon election, she became the second woman to hold the role of president. In 2017, she was elected a fellow of the NSBP. She has also served on the International Union of Pure and Applied Physics (IUPAP) Women in Physics Working Group and the Edward Bouchet Abdus Salam Institute (EBASI) Executive Body. The same year, she delivered the commencement address to the graduating class at her alma mater, Louisiana State University. She is also a board member of Lighthouse Louisiana, which focuses on empowering individuals with disabilities.

Horton is the founder of Unapologetically Being, Inc., a nonprofit that supports advocacy and mentoring in STEM.

Books 
Horton is the author of the "Dr. H" children's book series focused on STEM topics.

Awards 
 NASA Space Flight Awareness Team award
 NASA Marshall Space Flight Center Certificate of Appreciation Honor Award
 Trailblazer Award, 2010 Black Engineer of the Year Awards
 Inducted to Sigma Pi Sigma (2018)
 Louisianan of the Year (2019)
 LSU Alumni Hall of Distinction honoree (2020)

Personal life 
Horton has three children and two grandchildren.

References

External links 
 Video: Faces of Technology – Meet Renee Horton
 Video: Black Women in Tech: Dr. K Renee Horton breaks barriers in space
 Personal website, K. Renee Horton
 Des Moines Public Library Podcast: Dr. K. Renee Horton

American physicists
Year of birth missing (living people)
Living people
African-American physicists
Louisiana State University alumni
University of Alabama alumni
People from Baton Rouge, Louisiana